Belton is a small village and civil parish in the North West Leicestershire district of Leicestershire, England.

According to the 2011 Census, the parish (Including Grace-Dieu) had a population of 734.

History

The village's name means 'farm/settlement close to a beacon or funeral pyre'. Another suggestion is farm/settlement on an island or glade'.

"The Parish Church of Belton is a 14th century structure with a later perpendicular tower, clorestory and roof. It contains the recumbent effigy tomb of Lady Roesia de Verdun, foundress of the nearby Grace Dieu Priory, and Frances Beaumont, Justice of the Common Pleas, was also buried in the church on 22nd April 1598. The registers go back to 1538."

Belton also has a Church of England Primary school which caters for children aged between 4 and 10. The original school was founded in 1843 and the present school was built in 1976. Situated on Sadlers Wells in the center of the village.

The local football team, Belton Villa FC, play in Division Two of the North Leicestershire Football League. The village is also home to a doctors surgery which is situated at number 1 Mill Lane. Belton has one of the few remaining free-standing maypoles in the country. The village is also home to The Queens Head which is a gastro pub and restaurant situated in the heart of the village. A former coaching inn, it was turned into a public house in the 1800s.

Industry and employment 

The earliest occupational data for Belton is from 1881. The stacked bar chart presents a simplified version of the 1881 occupational data, using the 'Orders' used in the published reports for 1881, plus an 'Unknown' category. Many of these categories combine 'Workers and Dealers' in different commodities, therefore it is hard to distinguish workers in manufacturing and services. 

The most common occupational area of the time was agriculture. This is more than likely due to the surroundings of Belton; the parish has vast surroundings of arable land still used today. This factor, along with the fact that jobs today may not have existed back then, meant there was a limited number of professions to go into. Agriculture, unsurprisingly, was dominated by males at the time, whereas many of the women's occupation were unknown, or in domestic services.

The Occupational data here from the 2011 Census shows us the change over time in all different manner of occupations. The most popular is professional occupations, with around 71 and just under 20% of the economically active residents, followed by managers, directors and senior officials, where there are around 54, which is just under 15% of the economically active population. 
Of the 734 residents of Belton, there are 358 out of a possible 365 who are economically active between the ages of 16 and 74. This breaks down to 49% of the village being economically active and in employment. Around 15% of the village are retired and the remainder of the village fall under; sick/disabled, students, or look after home/family.

Population and housing

The earliest record of population in Belton was in 1801, when there was a total of 586 residents in the area. This increased steadily for 50 years to 751. However, a gap in the dataset from 1851 to 1881 shows there was a significant drop between here to 645. From 1881 there was a steady decline until 1911, where after that there has been a steady increase to a current population of 734. This could be down to the boundary changes that happened between 1931 and 1934 which changed the acreage and population of Belton. 
The 2011 census recorded that 49% of the village was male and 51% female which suggests the gender distribution is rather well balanced.

The 2011 census also noted that of the 734 residents, 712 classed themselves as White; English/Welsh/Scottish/Northern Irish/British (Persons)1. This gives the impression of a very monocultured society. More information showed that the Parish was predominantly Christian, with 69% stating that. Which isn't surprising as Christianity is the most practice religion in the country. A further 20% stated no religion and 9% didn't state theirs. 
This information isn't unsurprising as due to the low population and the Parish is based around a church, with a Church of England school also at the heart. The likelihood is that Christianity would be the most popular religion.

Housing in Belton has fluctuated through the 20th century dropping to 126 houses in 1921 and rising to 184 houses in 1961. Since then there has been a steady increase up to the current number of 315 houses recorded from the last census. The current make up of households are primarily built up of Married/Same sex partnerships without children, followed closely by Married/Same sex partnerships with children.

References

External links

Villages in Leicestershire
Civil parishes in Leicestershire
North West Leicestershire District